The 2008 United States presidential election in Texas took place on November 4, 2008, and was part of the 2008 United States presidential election. Voters chose 34 representatives, or electors to the Electoral College, who voted for president and vice president.

Texas was won by Republican nominee John McCain by an 11.8% margin of victory despite "failing to deliver written certification of their nominations" on time to appear on the ballot. Barack Obama, the Democratic nominee and eventual President, made a similar error. Prior to the election, all 17 news organizations considered this a state McCain would win, or otherwise a red state. Although the state is very diverse and has a huge Latino population, Latinos in Texas, despite being fairly Democratic, make up only 20% of the electorate. Polling throughout the state showed McCain consistently and substantially leading Obama. On Election Day, McCain won the state, although his margin was significantly less than that of George W. Bush in 2000 and 2004. This was the first election since 1996 in which the margin of victory was less than one million votes. Regardless, with its 34 electoral votes, Texas was the largest prize for McCain in 2008. This was the first time since 1924 that Texas gave a majority of the vote to a losing candidate.

, this is the last time the Democratic candidate won Brewster County and the last in which Kenedy County voted for the winning candidate.

Primaries
 2008 Texas Democratic presidential primary and caucuses
 2008 Texas Republican presidential primary

Campaign

Predictions
There were 16 news organizations who made state-by-state predictions of the election. Here are their last predictions before election day:

Polling

McCain won every single pre-election poll. The final 3 polls averaged McCain leading 52% to 41%.

Fundraising
Obama raised $20,424,500. McCain raised $17,990,153.

Advertising and visits
Obama and his interest groups spent $9,917,565. McCain and his interest groups spent $33,983. Both campaigns visited the state twice.

Analysis

Texas, split between the south and southwest regions of the United States, has become a consistently Republican state at all levels and is the home state of then President George W. Bush. Economically and racially diverse, Texas includes a huge swath of the Bible Belt where many voters, especially those in rural areas, identify as born-again or evangelical Christians and therefore tend to vote Republican due to the party's opposition to abortion and gay marriage. Although once part of the Solid South, the last time Texas voted for a Democratic presidential nominee was Jimmy Carter in 1976.
	 
McCain did well throughout the state, winning the vast majority of counties by double digits. He took practically every county in Eastern Texas - large regions of which once voted Democratic. All the suburbs of the major cities voted Republican by large margins. He also dominated the Texas Panhandle (including Amarillo), the Permian Basin (including Midland and Odessa) and the South Plains (including Lubbock), three of the most conservative regions in the country.  He won these three regions by margins of three-to-one—his largest margin of victory in the entire country.  These areas had been among the first in Texas where the old-line conservative Democrats started splitting their tickets and voting Republican nationally; some counties in this region haven't supported a Democrat since Harry S. Truman in 1948. King County, a thinly populated county in the Panhandle, gave McCain 92.64% of the vote to Obama's 4.91%--McCain's biggest margin in any county in the nation.
	
Despite the expected loss, Obama improved substantially upon John Kerry's performance in 2004, narrowing the margin of victory from 22.83% down to 11.77%. He was able to flip major urban counties such as Dallas, Bexar and Harris counties—home to the cities of Dallas, San Antonio, and Houston respectively. Dallas and Harris had been among the first areas of the state to turn Republican, largely due to an influx of Northern expatriates in the 1940s and 1950s. Neither county had supported a Democrat for president since 1964.  Bexar had last gone Democratic in 1996. Liberal whites and Hispanic voters in Dallas combined with heavy turnout of African Americans in Houston, and Hispanic turnout in San Antonio helped give Obama the edge and carry these three counties. Obama also performed strongly in Travis County, which contains the state capital of Austin. Obama also carried El Paso County, which contains the city of El Paso, due in large part to heavy support by Hispanics. Obama also carried many of the Latino-majority counties in the Rio Grande Valley along the border with Mexico, which have strongly supported Democrats for decades. Although Obama lost the rural Tarrant county, he did well in the southern and eastern parts of Fort Worth and the eastern part of Arlington.

During the same election, incumbent Republican U.S. Senator John Cornyn was reelected with 54.82% and defeated Democrat Rick Noriega who took in 42.84%. Libertarian Yvonne Adams Schick received the remaining 2.34%. Republicans also knocked off a Democratic incumbent from Texas in the U.S. House of Representatives. At the state level, however, Democrats picked up three seats in the Texas House of Representatives and one seat in the Texas Senate.

Results

By county

Counties that flipped from Republican to Democratic
 Bexar (largest city: San Antonio)
 Brewster (largest city: Alpine)
 Cameron (largest community: Brownsville)
 Culberson (largest municipality: Van Horn)
 Dallas (largest city: Dallas)
 Frio (largest municipality: Pearsall)
 Harris (largest community: Houston)
 Kleberg (largest municipality: Kingsville)
 Reeves (largest municipality: Pecos)
 Val Verde (largest municipality: Del Rio)

By congressional district

John McCain carried 21 of the state's 32 congressional districts, including one district held by a Democrat.

Electors

Technically the voters of Texas cast their ballots for electors: representatives to the Electoral College. Texas is allocated 34 electors because it has 32 congressional districts and 2 senators. All candidates who appear on the ballot or qualify to receive write-in votes must submit a list of 34 electors, who pledge to vote for their candidate and his or her running mate. Whoever wins the majority of votes in the state is awarded all 34 electoral votes. Their chosen electors then vote for president and vice president. Although electors are pledged to their candidate and running mate, they are not obligated to vote for them. An elector who votes for someone other than his or her candidate is known as a faithless elector.

The electors of each state and the District of Columbia met on December 15, 2008, to cast their votes for president and vice president. The Electoral College itself never meets as one body. Instead the electors from each state and the District of Columbia met in their respective capitols.

The following were the members of the Electoral College from the state. All 34 were pledged to John McCain and Sarah Palin:

Marcia Daughtrey
Virgil Vickery
Charlie O'Reilly
Brenda Zielke
Mary Darby
Melba McDow
Paul Pressler

Deborah Cupples
Frank Alvarez
Russ Duerstine
Zan Prince
Bruce Harris
Gordon Starkenburg
Sandra Cararas
Donene O'Dell
Larry Lovelace
Nelda Eppes
Kenneth Corbin
Gene Ryder
Robert Hierynomus
Terese Raia
Arturo Martinez de Vara
Thomas Ferguson
Robert Long
Pat Peale
Joel Yowell
Judith Hooge
Giovanna Searcy
Patricia Ann Van Winkle
Ronny Risinger
Frank Eikenburg
Genny Hensz
Talmadge Heflin

See also
 United States presidential elections in Texas
 Presidency of Barack Obama

References

Texas
2008
2008 Texas elections